The Special Powers Act may refer to:

 The Civil Authorities (Special Powers) Act (Northern Ireland) 1922
 The Armed Forces (Special Powers) Act of India
 Special Powers Act, 1974 of Bangladesh

See also 
 War Powers Act, also called War Powers Resolution of 1973 of United States